The Glory of Living is a 1996 play by Rebecca Gilman. The play received its first production at the Circle Theatre Chicago in Forest Park, Illinois.  The play has won several awards and was a finalist for the 2002 Pulitzer Prize for Drama.

Plot

The play opens with the main characters Lisa and Clint meeting for the first time. Clint has accompanied a friend to Lisa and her mother's mobile home to see Lisa's mother, a prostitute. Clint picks up on Lisa's unease about her mother's situation and begins charming her. The next scene opens a few years later and Clint and Lisa have married and have twins who are being cared for by Clint's mother. The couple has been living in a series of motel rooms and are playing a scam whereby Lisa lures young girls into the room where Clint rapes and abuses them. Afterwards, Lisa murders the girls and disposes of their bodies. Plagued with guilt, Lisa calls the police with anonymous tips on the location of the bodies. Act I concludes with the couple's arrest.

Act II deals primarily with the couple's punishments but focuses on Lisa and her motives for her actions. The audience is shown that Lisa has not been able to emotionally mature and that has led her to live the life she has lived.

Notable productions
 Circle Theatre Chicago, December 1996 - world premiere. Directed by Robin Stanton.
 Royal Court Theatre, London, 1999. Directed by Kathryn Hunter
 Off-Broadway, MCC Theater production, October 30, 2001 to December 2, 2001. Directed by Philip Seymour Hoffman with Anna Paquin as Lisa and Jeffrey Donovan as Clint and David Aaron Baker as Carl.

Dublin July 2005 produced by AboutFACE Theatre Company at Project Arts Centre and at the Civic Theatre, Tallaght. Directed by Erin Murray.

Awards and recognition
Finalist for the 2002 Pulitzer Prize in Drama
Joseph Jefferson Citation for Best Play in Chicago.
American Theatre Critics Association's Osborn Award for Best New American Play.
 2002 Drama Desk Award:
 Outstanding Actress (Play), Anna Paquin (nominee)
 Outstanding Sound Design, David Van Tieghem (nominee)

References

External links
 
The Complete Review
Washington Post Review- June 2, 2006, by Celia Wren, 'The Glory of Living': Running on Empty in America, Didactic Theatre Company production

Plays by Rebecca Gilman
1996 plays
Forest Park, Illinois